Bridges is the second studio album by English singer-songwriter Calum Scott, released on 17 June 2022 through Capitol Records. It was preceded by five singles—"Biblical", "Rise", "If You Ever Change Your Mind", "Heaven", and "Boys in the Street". Scott embarked on an ongoing world tour in support of the album, beginning in North America in July 2022.

Themes
The tracks have themes of resilience, with Scott saying that he wrote "Rise" during COVID-19 lockdowns when he was "really down on [him]self", as well as the power of love, with Scott explaining that "Biblical" is about "love of biblical proportions that transcends everyone and everything", with "Heaven" following a similar theme of "the love between two people being so powerful that it is far superior to anything else". While "If You Ever Change Your Mind" was written "about the pain of heartbreak and lost love", it also has "undertones of hopefulness throughout".

Singles
The lead single, "Biblical", was released on 10 June 2021, with second single "Rise" following on 1 October 2021. Third single "If You Ever Change Your Mind" was issued on 4 February 2022. The fourth single, "Heaven", was released alongside the album announcement on 29 April 2022. On 1 June 2022, Scott released the fifth single, which is his rendition of Seeb and Greg Holden's "Boys in the Street".

Commercial performance
On 24 June 2022, Bridges debuted at number 48 on the UK Albums Chart, with 2,158 sales.

Track listing

Notes
 On physical editions, the song "Bridges" contains the hidden track "Father", which begins after several seconds of silence, making the track 6:06 in length and the album duration 50:43 overall.

Charts

References

2022 albums
Albums produced by Fraser T. Smith
Albums produced by Greg Kurstin
Albums produced by Jon Maguire
Calum Scott albums
Capitol Records albums
EMI Records albums